Øvre Sjodalsvatnet is a lake in Vågå Municipality in Innlandet county, Norway. It is located in the Jotunheimen mountain range. The lake is located on the river Sjoa, just outside the boundary of Jotunheimen National Park. The Maurvangen campground and Bessheim mountain lodge are located near the southwestern shore of the lake.

The river Sjoa flows from the lake Gjende by Gjendesheim through the lakes Øvre Sjodalsvatnet and Nedre Sjodalsvatnet and all the way to the village of Sjoa in the Gudbrandsdalen valley where the river empties into the large river Gudbrandsdalslågen.

The Sjoa river is a popular site for rafting and kayak trips. The river is also known for the tourist attraction Ridderspranget

See also
List of lakes in Norway

References

External links
Bessheim Fjellstue and Cabins
Maurvangen Camp Ground

Vågå
Lakes of Innlandet